was a Japanese actress. She is best known for her performance as Sada Abe in In the Realm of the Senses. She also appeared in Seibo Kannon daibosatsu (1977) and Pinku saron: Kōshoku gonin onna (1978).

She died on 9 March 2011 of a brain tumor.

Filmography

References

External links
 

1952 births
2011 deaths
People from Yokohama
Japanese film actresses